Intimate Headshot is a 2009 Hungarian comedy film directed by Péter Szajki.

Cast 
 Gyözö Szabó - Gábor
 Tibor Gáspár - Ákos
 Lehel Kovács - Tomi
 Zsolt Huszár - Balázs
 Eszter Nagy-Kálózy - Mari
 Kata Gáspár - Kati

References

External links 

2009 comedy films
2009 films
Hungarian comedy films